Albert Anis (1889–1964) was an architect in Miami, Florida known for his Art Deco architecture. He was one of a group of American-born architects working in Miami Beach who synthesized the austere architectural principles of the International Style architecture with their own brand of modernism which embraced the ornamentation and exotic lure of the tropical.

Career
Anis was the architect for a number of outstanding Art Deco-style buildings in Chicago in the 1920s, and hotels on Ocean Drive, in Miami Beach. Among his most noted works are:

The Whitelaw Hotel (1936) 808 Collins Avenue, Miami Beach FL
Waldorf Towers Hotel (1937), Ocean Drive, Miami Beach FL
The Winterhaven Hotel (1937)
The Leslie Hotel (1937), Ocean Drive, Miami Beach FL
The Chesterfield Hotel, formally called Helmor Hotel (1938) 855 Collins Avenue, Miami Beach FL
The Traymore Hotel (1939) 2445 Collins Avenue
Clevelander Hotel (1939), Ocean Drive, Miami Beach FL
The Abbey Hotel (1940)
Majestic Hotel (1940), Ocean Drive, Miami Beach FL
The Viscay Hotel (1941)
Avalon Hotel (1941), Ocean Drive, Miami Beach FL
The Mantell Plaza (1942)
Colonade Apartments (1946) 2365 Pinetree Drive, Miami Beach FL currently called Tradewinds Apartment Hotel
Pineview Apartments (1947) 2351 Pinetree Drive, Miami Beach FL currently called Tradewinds Apartment Hotel
Temple Emanuel (1947)
Bhojwani Tower (1950s)

Gallery

References

1889 births
1964 deaths
Art Deco architects
20th-century American architects
Architects from Illinois
Architects from Miami